Ndugutu Hydroelectric Power Station, also Ndugutu Power Station, is a proposed  mini-hydropower station in the Western Region of Uganda.

Location
This location is in close proximity of the  Sindila Hydroelectric Power Station, which is owned by the same developer.

Overview
Ndugutu HEPS is a run-of-river mini-hydro power plant whose planned maximum installed capacity is 4.8 MW. The project is owned  by  KMR East Africa Company (also Ndugutu Power Company Uganda Limited), the project developers. The construction of this power station was budgeted at US$15 million, with US$3.2 million in GetFit concessions.

Timetable
The project received approval for GetFit support in June 2015. Financial close was reached in 2016. Construction was expected to start during 2017, with completion expected during the fourth quarter of 2018.

See also

 List of power stations in Uganda

References

External links
  Overview of Uganda's Energy Sector In 2012
 Uganda – energy, oil and gas are key areas of investment As of 5 July 2016.

Hydroelectric power stations in Uganda
Bundibugyo District
Proposed hydroelectric power stations
Proposed renewable energy power stations in Uganda